Hooch, as a surname, may refer to the following fictional characters:

 Rolanda Hooch, a teacher at Hogwarts in the Harry Potter series by J.K. Rowling
 Dr. Hooch (Scrubs), a minor character from Scrubs
 DC Hooch, a character in Coronation Street

See also
 De Hooch, a Dutch surname